was a Japanese manga artist, and creator of several anime and manga series. His wife Miyako Maki is also a manga artist.

Matsumoto was famous for his space operas such as Space Battleship Yamato and Galaxy Express 999. His style was characterized by mythological and often tragic storylines with strong moral themes, noble heroes, feminine heroines, and a love of strange worlds and melancholic atmosphere.

Early life 
Leiji Matsumoto was born January 25, 1938, in Kurume, Fukuoka. He was the middle child of a family of seven brothers, and, in his early childhood, Matsumoto was given a 35mm film projector by his father. He watched American cartoons during the Pacific War and developed an interest in science fiction novels by Unno Juza and H. G. Wells. Matsumoto started drawing when he was six and, inspired by Osamu Tezuka's work, began drawing manga three years later. He moved to Tokyo at 18 to become a manga artist.

Career

In 1954, Matsumoto made his debut under his real name, Akira Matsumoto, with Mitsubachi no bōken in the magazine Manga Shōnen.

Matsumoto's big break came with Otoko Oidon, a series chronicling the life of a student rōnin (a young man preparing for university entrance exams), in 1971. In 1972 he created the mature-themed dark comedy Western seinen series Gun Frontier for Play Comic magazine, which ran from 1972 to 1975. Around the same time he started a series of unconnected short stories set during World War II, Senjo Manga Series, which would eventually become popular under the title The Cockpit.

He was involved in Space Battleship Yamato (1974) and created the highly popular series Space Pirate Captain Harlock (1977) and Galaxy Express 999 (1977). In 1978, he was awarded the Shogakukan Manga Award for shōnen for Galaxy Express 999 and Senjo Manga Series. Animated versions of Captain Harlock and Galaxy Express 999 are set in the same universe, which spawned several spin offs and related series, most notably Queen Emeraldas and Queen Millennia.

Matsumoto supervised the creation of several music videos for the French house group Daft Punk, set to tracks from their album Discovery. These videos were issued end-to-end (making a full-length animated movie) on a DVD release titled Interstella 5555: The 5tory of the 5ecret 5tar 5ystem.

Some two dozen bronze statues—each four feet tall—of characters and scenes from Space Battleship Yamato and Galaxy Express 999 were erected in the downtown of Tsuruga in 1999. Each includes a plaque explaining the character and features Matsumoto's signature.

Matsumoto worked with Yoshinobu Nishizaki on Space Battleship Yamato (known outside Japan under various names, but most commonly as Star Blazers). Matsumoto created a manga loosely based on the series, and the Yamato makes cameo appearances (sans crew) in several of his works including the Galaxy Express 999 manga.

A later work by Matsumoto called Great Yamato featuring an updated Yamato was renamed Great Galaxy due to legal issues with Nishizaki. As of 2009, Matsumoto and Nishizaki were working on independent anime projects featuring the acclaimed Space Battleship Yamato, with the conditions that Matsumoto cannot use the name Yamato or the plot or characters from the original, and Nishizaki cannot use the conceptual art, character or ship designs of the original.

In August 2014, to celebrate the 60th anniversary of his debut, Matsumoto launched the manga Captain Harlock: Jigen Kōkai (Captain Harlock: Dimensional Voyage), illustrated by Kōichi Shimahoshi, in the pages of Akita Shoten's Champion Red magazine. Dimensional Voyage is a retelling of the original 1978 Space Pirate Captain Harlock manga. It had been licensed in the United States by Seven Seas Entertainment.

Personal life 
Matsumoto was married to manga artist and Licca-chan creator Miyako Maki.

On November 15, 2019, Matsumoto suffered severe respiratory problems and collapsed during an event in Turin, Italy, for the 40th-anniversary tour celebrating Captain Harlock anime adaptation. He was taken to a hospital in critical condition and had a breathing tube inserted after he was admitted to the emergency unit. However, he was considered to be out of danger two days later.

Death
Matsumoto died of acute heart failure at a hospital in Tokyo on February 13, 2023, at 85. Various manga artists offered condolences, including Yasuhiro Nightow, Nozomu Tamaki, and his wife Maki. Galaxy Express 999 voice actress Masako Nozawa and translator Zack Davisson also gave their condolences.

Selected works

See also 
 Marianne Hold—German actress who is the template for Matsumoto's lead female characters.

References

External links

  
 
 
 Leijiverse—The world of Leiji Matsumoto
 Leiji Matsumoto at The Encyclopedia of Science Fiction
 Leiji Matsumoto manga  and anime at Media Arts Database 
 Ozma interview
 Ozma interview with Asahi Shimbun

 
1938 births
2023 deaths
Chevaliers of the Ordre des Arts et des Lettres
Japanese animators
Japanese illustrators
Manga artists from Fukuoka Prefecture
People from Kitakyushu
People from Kurume
Recipients of the Medal with Purple Ribbon
Recipients of the Order of the Rising Sun, 4th class
Space Battleship Yamato
Toei Animation